Chicken Rock, part of Rushen parish, is the southernmost island administered by the Isle of Man. The most prominent feature of the rock is the 19th century Chicken Rock Lighthouse. The  lighthouse was first lit in 1875, and is owned and maintained by the Northern Lighthouse Board.

See also

 List of lighthouses in the Isle of Man

References

External links
Northern Lighthouses Board

Islands of the Isle of Man